Shelving engineering is the science of studying static loadings that happen in retail stores and in stocks. It includes the study, design and often the manufacturing and supply of a shelving system. It is often referred to as "gondola shelving engineering" when specifically applied to retailer and mall environments.

Usually built of metal, retailers' shelving must comply with loading capacity and user safety requirements, whilst at the same time taking into account marketing requirements for highly effective displays, colours, images and signs.

Finite elements analysis add to a company's calculations about the stress and the strength of shelving. Worldwide, the only norm available is the UNI norm, which has been created by the five main Gondola Shopfitting Shelving companies of Italy. The norm is the UNI 11262-1:2008 on "Scaffalature Commerciali".

The industry hopes that this norm will be accepted as the EN European Norm and then the ISO World Norm.

Retail processes and techniques